Canning is a town of the South 24 Parganas district in the Indian state of West Bengal. It is situated on the western banks of the Matla River. It is the headquarters of the Canning subdivision.

Etymology
This town is named after Lord Canning, the former Governor General of India from 1856 to 1858, and Governor General and Viceroy from 1858 to 1862.

History
H. E. A. Cotton writes, "The year 1864… It witnessed also the speculative mania over an unlucky scheme for the reclamation of the Sunderbans, of which nothing remains but the deserted wharves of Port Canning, but which resulted in ruin to many". The idea of developing a major port at the town faded with the choking of the Matla River as a result of inadequate headwater supply.

Lord Canning had wanted to build a port that would be an alternative to Kolkata and a rival to Singapore. What no one heeded were the warnings of a lowly shipping inspector Henry Piddington, who had lived in the Caribbean and knew all about hurricanes and storms. He wanted the mangroves to be left alone, as they were Bengal’s defensive barrier against nature’s fury and absorbed the initial onslaught of cyclonic winds, waves and tidal surges. The settlement was built with a strand, hotels and homes, but in 1867 the Matla River surged and reduced the town to a "bleached skeleton".

In 1862, the Eastern Bengal Railway opened a southward line from what was then known as Beliaghata station to Port Canning. In the same year, the Eastern Bengal Railway had opened its line from Sealdah to Kushtia. The Eastern Bengal Railway was taken over by the government in 1887. Services on the eastern side of Hooghly River were unified under the Eastern Bengal State Railway and after further amalgamation in 1942, the Bengal Assam Railway.

Geography

Area overview
Canning subdivision has a very low level of urbanization. Only 12.37% of the population lives in the urban areas and 87.63% lives in the rural areas. There are 8 census towns in Canning I CD block and only 2 in the rest of the subdivision. The entire district is situated in the Ganges Delta with numerous islands in the southern part of the region. The area (shown in the map below) borders on the Sundarbans National Park and a major portion of it is a part of the Sundarbans settlements. It is a flat low lying area in the South Bidyadhari plains. The Matla River is prominent and there are many streams and water channels locally known as khals. A comparatively recent country-wide development is the guarding of the coastal areas with special a coastal force.

Note: The map below presents some of the notable locations in the subdivision. All places marked in the map are linked in the larger full screen map.

Location

Canning is the gateway of the Sundarbans. It is situated on the western banks of the Matla River. One can cross the Matla River and then proceed to Basanti for a boat to the interior of the Sundarbans or hire a motor launch for travel to Sundarbans at the town itself. The first watch tower at Sajnekhali is about 5 hours away.

Climate
Köppen-Geiger climate classification system classifies its climate as tropical wet and dry (Aw).

The overall climate of Canning is humid and warm. In summer, the maximum temperature goes 35 °C while in mild winters, minimum temperature drops 14 °C. The highest temperature ever was 42.5 °C, recorded on 17 May 1987. The lowest temperature ever dropped was 7.6 °C, dropped on 30 January 2007. The mean annual temperature is 26.5 °C. Average annual rainfall is approximately 1850 mm, 85 days feel the rain. Air is humid throughout the year, the amount is 77%.

Demographics
Canning is not identified as a separate place in the 2011 census records. The map of the CD block Canning I on the page number 333 in the District Census Handbook 2011 for the South 24 Parganas district shows Canning as being a part of the Matla and Dighirpar census towns.

Civic administration

Police stations
It has jurisdiction over parts of the Canning I and Canning II CD blocks.

Canning women police station has jurisdiction over parts of the Canning I and Canning II CD blocks.

CD block HQ
The headquarters of the Canning I CD block are located at Canning.

Economy
The District Human Development Report, South 24 Parganas, writes, "Canning has emerged as a major market for supply of fish to Kolkata. The fishermen of the area bring their catch to the all-night fish market at Canning. Here the commission agents receive the fish and auction them. It is bought by the wholesalers and transported to Kolkata for sale to retailers, who sell it in different markets. However, as greater part of Kolkata’s fish now come from South India and Madhya Pradesh, local wholesale trade at Canning has lost out in the competition. There is, of course, scope of reviving this market once again".

In 1980-81, Canning produced 332.5 tonnes of fresh domestic fish and 60.2 tonnes of exportable prawns. While the exportable prawns were despatched to processors at Kolkata, 59% of the fresh domestic fish was sent to markets in Kolkata.

As of 2019, the daily demand in the Kolkata fish market is around 550 tonnes. Andhra Pradesh-Telangana-Odisha supplies around 150 tonnes and the balance 400 tonnes is local supply from around Kolkata.

Transport
Baruipur-Canning Road links Canning to the State Highway 1.

Canning railway station is on the Sealdah–Canning line of the Kolkata Suburban Railway system.

Commuters
With the electrification of the railways, suburban traffic has grown tremendously since the 1960s. As of 2005-06, more than 1.7 million (17 lakhs) commuters use the Kolkata Suburban Railway system daily. After the partition of India, refugees from East Pakistan/ Bangladesh had a strong impact on the development of urban areas in the periphery of Kolkata. The new immigrants depended on Kolkata for their livelihood, thus increasing the number of commuters. Eastern Railway runs 1,272 EMU trains daily.

Education
Bankim Sardar College, established in 1955, is affiliated with the University of Calcutta. It offers honours courses in English, Bengali, Sanskrit, history, political science, education, physics, botany, zoology, B.Com. Hons., general courses in arts, science, commerce and post graduation in Bengali.

Canning David Sasoon High School is a Bengali-medium coeducational school. It was established in 1933 and has facilities for teaching from class V to class XII.

Canning Dwarikanath Balika Vidyalaya Up High School is a Bengali-medium school for girls. It was established in 1936 and has facilities for teaching from class V to class XII.

Raybaghini High School is a Bengali-medium coeducational school. It was established in 1949 and has facilities for teaching from class V to class XII.

St Gabrial High School is a Bengali-medium school for boys. It was established in 1930 and has facilities for teaching from class V to class X.

Healthcare
Canning Subdivisional Hospital, with 100 beds, is the major government medical facility in the Canning subdivision.

References

External links
 

Cities and towns in South 24 Parganas district